Colchester United Football Club is an English professional football club based in Colchester, Essex, that was founded in 1937.

Colchester United competed in the Southern Football League from 1937 until 1950, when they were elected to the Football League. During this time, Colchester produced one of the most notable FA Cup runs by a non-league side in 1947–48, as they defeated fellow non-leaguers Banbury Spencer in the first round, before beating Football League clubs Wrexham, Huddersfield Town and Bradford Park Avenue. They finally fell to Blackpool in the fifth round.

Colchester played in the Third Division South for eight seasons, until the league was re-organised at the end of the 1957–58 season. They finished in 12th position in the table that year, meaning that from the 1958–59 season, the U's would play in the Third Division. Colchester remained in the Third Division until they were relegated in 1961, but made an immediate return to the third tier when they finished the 1961–62 season in second position, one point behind champions Millwall.

Three years later, the club finished 23rd of 24 clubs in the Third Division, as they were relegated back to the Fourth Division. Another single season in the fourth tier followed as Colchester were promoted in fourth position. Their spell in the Third Division was brief, as they were once again relegated in 1968.

The U's remained in the Fourth Division for a further six seasons, but during this period, they embarked on one of the most notable runs in FA Cup history. Manager Dick Graham took his ageing side to the 1970–71 quarter-finals. They dispatched non-league side Ringmer in the first round, before knocking-out Cambridge United, Barnet and Rochdale following a replay. United faced Don Revie's formidable Leeds United side in the fifth round, who were at the top of the First Division at the time. The U's raced to an unprecedented 3–0 lead in the match, before Leeds pulled two goals back. The match ended 3–2 to Colchester to record a famous giant-killing victory. The U's then faced Everton in the quarter-final but lost 5–0 at Goodison Park. Three seasons later, Colchester sealed promotion again as they ended the 1973–74 season in third place.

Relegation from the Third Division followed in 1976, with promotion again following one season later. Colchester returned to the Fourth Division for the final time in 1981 as they finished 22nd of 24 teams. Colchester struggled financially in the late 1980s and suffered a significant drop in form, resulting in the club finishing bottom of the entire Football League in 1990 and as such were relegated to the Conference.

Colchester returned to the Football League at the second attempt, finishing second to Barnet in 1990–91, before beating Wycombe Wanderers to the title in 1991–92. The club completed a league and cup double as they lifted the FA Trophy. Now in the recently renamed Division Three, Colchester earned a play-off spot in the 1995–96 season, but lost in the semi-finals to Plymouth Argyle. The U's reached Wembley for the first time for the 1997 Football League Trophy Final, but were defeated on penalties by Carlisle United.

Colchester did achieve Wembley success the following season as they beat Torquay United 1–0 in the 1998 Football League Third Division play-off Final. The club consolidated their position in the third tier for a number of seasons, before they achieved another feat in earning promotion to the Championship in 2006 by finishing in second position to Southend United. Colchester then finished in 10th position in the Championship, their highest-ever league finish. However, the following season, they were relegated back to League One.

Following relegation from the Championship, Colchester remained in League One for eight seasons. Initially the club fought for the play-off positions, but began to struggle in the lower reaches of the league by the 2012–13 season, narrowly avoiding relegation that year. Colchester were relegated from League One to the fourth tier of English football for the first time in 18 years at the end of the 2015–16 season.

In League Two, Colchester were competitive, finishing in the top-half of the table regularly. The club reached the 2019–20 play-offs, but were eliminated in the semi-finals by Exeter City. The following season, Colchester struggled amidst the constraints of the COVID-19 pandemic, only securing their League Two status in the penultimate game of the season.

Since their formation in 1937, as of the 2021–22 season, Colchester United have spent two seasons in the second tier of English football, 37 seasons in the third tier, 30 seasons in the fourth tier and two seasons in the Football Conference. Prior to their 1950 election to the Football League, Colchester spent seven seasons in the Southern League. The table below details Colchester United's in all senior first-team competitions from the 1937–38 season to the end of the most recently completed season.

Key

Key to league record:
P – Played
W – Games won
D – Games drawn
L – Games lost
F – Goals for
A – Goals against
Pts – Points
Pos – Final position

Key to colours and symbols:

Key to divisions:
CHA – Championship
CON – Conference
D2 – Second Division
D3 – Third Division
D3S – Third Division South
D4 – Fourth Division
L1 – League One
L2 – League Two
SFL – Southern League

Key to cups:
Comp – Competition played
SLC – Southern League Cup
WC – Watney Cup
AMC/FLT/EFLT – Associate Members' Cup/Football League Trophy/EFL Trophy
BLT – Bob Lord Trophy
FAT – FA Trophy

Key to rounds:
4QR – Fourth qualifying round
GS – Group stage
R1 – First round, etc.
QF – Quarter-finals
SF – Semi-finals
F – Finals
W – Winners
(S) – Southern section
DNE – Did not enter

Details of abandoned competitions are shown in italics and appropriately footnoted.

Seasons

Footnotes

References

Seasons
 
Colchester United